Paul Hermann (Budapest, 27 March 1902 – unknown 1944), also known as Pál Hermann, was a virtuoso cellist and composer.

Career
Hermann was born in Budapest, Hungary, on 27 March 1902 and came from a Jewish family. About his early childhood not much more than an anecdote remains: he was only prepared to study for his piano lessons if for every étude he prepared, he would receive one cent. He studied at the Franz Liszt Academy of Music from 1915–1919 and developed close relationships, both musical and personal, with his teachers of composition Béla Bartók and Zoltán Kodály, violinist Zoltán Székely, and pianists Géza Frid and Lili Kraus. At the Franz Liszt Academy of Music he studied cello under Adolf Schiffer and composition, first under Leo Weiner, who was also his teacher of chamber music. Already during his studies, Hermann was a frequent performer within and outside of the Liszt Academy. He started his international cello career at the age of 16, playing as a soloist music venues in Europe. Hermann felt that there was no need to finish his studies at the Liszt Academy.

Among the works Hermann premiered or gave notable early performances of as a virtuoso cellist during the 1920s were Frank Bridge's cello sonata in 1927 with Harry Isaacs, and solo cello sonata by Arnold Schoenberg.

Hermann taught cello and composition in the Musikschule Paul Hindemith Neukölln from 1929 to 1934. However, as the political climate in Berlin changed, most notably for Jews, and became more threatening, he decided to move first of all to Brussels from 1934–1937, and later to Paris from 1937 to 1939, and then on to the south of France. He was deported under the Vichy France régime in February 1944 from Toulouse to the internment camp of Drancy, and on 15 May 1944 he was sent to the Baltic States on the Drancy Convoy 73, and was not heard of again.

Personal life

During the early years of his career, Hermann used to visit London for recitals and concerts and then would stay at the de Graaff-Bachiene family residence, owned by patrons of the arts. A story about one of these stays survives. Hermann and his friend Szoltan Zekely had entertained a large company of people in the De Graaff household in London in 1928, at the peak of their musical partnership, with a house recital. Later that evening, Hermann had been the centre of attention during the after-concert soirée that followed and had jokingly started to dance with his own cello in his arms. The people applauded and he continued to spin and dance until he fell and his cello broke to pieces. To bring the evening to a happy ending was their host Jaap de Graaff, patron and protector of the arts, who decided to buy a Gagliano cello for Hermann, and a Stradivarius violin for Zekely.

On a visit to Holland around 1929, Jaap de Graaff suggested for his niece Ada Weevers, who lived in Amersfoort, to go and see Hermann perform in Amsterdam, and when they met, Ada and Hermann fell in love, despite their different cultures, nationalities and religions. The young couple moved to Berlin in 1930, and they had a daughter Corrie Hermann in 1932.

Ada died after a drowning accident in the North Sea. As the political climate in Berlin for Jews became more and more threatening,  he decided to hide his daughter with his non-Jewish sister-in-law in The Netherlands. Hermann moved on to work in Brussels from 1934–1937, and in Paris in 1937-1939, under a false name, and then moved to the south of France where he was hidden in a farmhouse near Toulouse of the French branch of the Weevers family, where he composed three melodies for voice and piano (Ophélie, La Ceinture, Dormeuse) and a violin/cello sonata. The composition of Ophélie, based on the character of Prince Hamlet’s beloved Ophelia who drowns in a river, may have been inspired by the tragic drowning of Hermann’s wife. He found the solitude of his hidden life on the farm hard to cope with, having lost his wife and far away from his daughter, and used to go out to Toulouse from time to time to teach and socialize, accepting the risk of being discovered.

Death
On one such visit to Toulouse, he was indeed picked up during a street razzia and transported to the Drancy concentration camp in spring 1944, and then onward to the Baltic States on the Drancy Convoy 73 on 15 May 1944, after which further traces of Hermann are missing.

The Prins Bernhard Cultuurfonds set up the Paul Hermann Fonds in Hermann's memory which offers scholarships to promising young cellists from the Franz Liszt Academy of Music.

Compositions

Paul Hermann left a small number of compositions, which are all now public domain in Europe.
 Grand Duo, pour violon et violoncelle (1929–30)
 Duo pour violon et violoncelle (1920, dédié a Zoltán Székely)
 Trio à cordes (1921)
 Toccata, pour piano (1936)
 Quatre Épigrammes, pour piano (1934)
 Trois mélodies sur des textes d'Arthur Rimbaud et de Paul Valéry, extrait de Charmes (1934–39)
 "Ophélie" 
 La Ceinture
 La Dormeuse

Recordings
No recordings of Hermann as an artist are known to survive, although he often performed recitals, or as a chamber musician with the Hungarian Quartet, with violinist Zoltán Székely and others. Of his concerts and recordings only the programs remain. Hermann was also heard on the radio, for example Wireless World 1937 records a broadcast of "Songs You Might Never Have Heard" with Paul Hermann (cello) and John Ireland (piano).

Recordings of compositions
Paul Hermann Forbidden Music in World War II - Cello concerto, Grand Duo für Violine & Cello; Streichtrio; Klaviertrio; Lieder; 4 Epigrammes; Allegro für Klavier; Toccata für Klavier; Suite für Klavier. Performed by Clive Greensmith, Beth Nam, Burkhard Maiss, Bogdan Jianu, Hannah Strijbos, Andrei Banciu, with soprano Irene Maessen Etcetera, DDD, (2CD) 2017

Footnotes

References
Paul Hermann (1902–1944)
Nous Sommes 900 Francais, Eve Line Blum-Cherchevsky, Besancon, tome 7, pp 362–364
Székely and Bartók: the story of a friendship
Musique dans les Camps de Concentration
"Pal Hermann attended those ISCM concerts..."

1902 births
1944 deaths
Musicians from Budapest
Hungarian cellists
Hungarian composers
Hungarian male composers
Hungarian Jews who died in the Holocaust
Jewish emigrants from Nazi Germany to France
Hungarian civilians killed in World War II
20th-century Hungarian male musicians
20th-century cellists